Gagatophorus is a genus of weevils belonging to the family Curculionidae, first described by Henri Jekel in 1865. The decisions for synonymy are based on work by Sigmund Schenkling and G.A.K. Marshall (Pseudamycterus), and Elwood Zimmerman (Gagatonotus and Macramycterus).

The species of this genus are found in Western Australia.

Species
Species:

Gagatophorus boisduvalii 
Gagatophorus draco 
Gagatophorus leichhardti 
Gagatophorus obsoletus 
Gagatophorus schoenherri 
Gagatophorus tibialis

Further reading

References

Cyclominae
Curculionidae genera
Animals described in 1865
Taxa named by Henri Jekel